Nikola Mirković (born 26 July 1991) is a Serbian football goalkeeper who plays for Mladost Novi Sad.

Career

SønderjyskE
On 28 January 2019, Mirkovic went on a trial to SønderjyskE and joined the squad, which at that time was in Turkey. The trial was successful, and the club announced on 6 February 2019, that they had signed the keeper for the rest of 2019. His contract was terminated by mutual agreement on 5 October 2020.

Honours
SønderjyskE
Danish Cup: 2019–20

References

External links
 
 Nikola Mirković stats at utakmica.rs 
 
 
 

1991 births
Living people
Sportspeople from Smederevo
Association football goalkeepers
Serbian footballers
Serbian expatriate footballers
FK Napredak Kruševac players
FK Mladi Radnik players
FK Spartak Subotica players
FK Rad players
NK Zvijezda Gradačac players
Atromitos F.C. players
SønderjyskE Fodbold players
FK Budućnost Dobanovci players
Serbian First League players
Serbian SuperLiga players
Premier League of Bosnia and Herzegovina players
Danish Superliga players
Serbian expatriate sportspeople in Bosnia and Herzegovina
Serbian expatriate sportspeople in Greece
Serbian expatriate sportspeople in Denmark
Expatriate footballers in Bosnia and Herzegovina
Expatriate footballers in Greece
Expatriate men's footballers in Denmark